Sarum inermis is a species of leaf beetle of the Democratic Republic of the Congo, described by Martin Jacoby in 1901.

References

Eumolpinae
Beetles of the Democratic Republic of the Congo
Beetles described in 1901
Taxa named by Martin Jacoby
Endemic fauna of the Democratic Republic of the Congo